Stibaromacha ratella is a moth of the family Autostichidae. It is found in France, Spain and Portugal. Outside of Europe, it has been recorded from Morocco, Algeria and Asia Minor.

References

Moths described in 1854
Stibaromacha
Moths of Europe